"White Teeth" is a song by American rapper YoungBoy Never Broke Again. It was released on May 14, 2021, as the second single from his third studio album Sincerely, Kentrell. It was produced by TayTayMadeIt.

Composition
In the song, YoungBoy mentions discarding his grills and his pearly white teeth, while also rapping about his love life and other "flexes".

Music video
The music video, directed by Picture Perfect, executive produced by James "Aggie" Barrett features NBA YoungBoy showing his pearly white teeth in front of a convenience store and his car, and wearing a sombrero with flames in some scenes. He is surrounded by "a bevy of beautiful women", with whom he lives the "rockstar life".

Charts

Certifications

References

2021 singles
2021 songs
Atlantic Records singles
Songs written by YoungBoy Never Broke Again
YoungBoy Never Broke Again songs